Mykhailo Petrovych Starytsky (14 December 1840 – 27 April 1904), in English Michael Starycky, was a Ukrainian writer, poet, and playwright.

He was born in a family of retired cavalry officer (Rittmeister) Petro Starytsky and Anastasia Lysenko. He was a cousin of the famous Ukrainian composer Mykola Lysenko and father-in-law of Ivan Steshenko. 

He was orphaned early in life and raised by Lysenko's father, so he was able to supply much of the information for the composer's biography. Starytsky wrote librettos, songs, stories, dramas and poems. Later in life, Starytsky worked with Lysenko, collecting Ukrainian folk songs and transforming them into plays and operas for which Starytsky wrote the librettos (including Taras Bulba, an adaptation of the novel by Gogol). He eventually switched from writing scripts for theatre to writing books. Starytsky is currently remembered for his work with Lysenko, as well as his later poetry and novels. He was buried at Baikove Cemetery in Kyiv.

References

External links 
 
 Entry in Encyclopedia of Ukraine

1840 births
1904 deaths
People from Cherkasy Oblast
People from Poltava Governorate
Ukrainian poets
Opera librettists
Hromada (society) members
19th-century poets
19th-century Ukrainian dramatists and playwrights
Taras Shevchenko National University of Kyiv alumni
Burials at Baikove Cemetery
Translators of William Shakespeare
Translators of Adam Mickiewicz